Defrag may refer to:

 Defragmentation, in the context of maintaining computer file systems, is a process that reduces the number of pieces of a file and/or the scattered available areas.
 DEFRAG, DOS and Windows 9x-systems FAT defragmentation utility
 DeFRaG, unofficial Quake III Arena video game modification

See also
 List of defragmentation software
 Comparison of defragmentation software